Michelle Marian Telfer (born 8 January 1974) is a retired Western Australian gymnast and practising paediatrician.

Gymnastics career
Liz Chetkovich first identified Telfer's talent in 1981 at the age of seven. In 1988, at the age of 14, Telfer was chosen to join the WAIS elite squad, training full-time. Telfer went on to represent Australia in the Junior Pacific Alliance Competition in Colorado Springs and the Gymnastics World Championships in West Germany in 1989.

In 1990, Telfer was selected for the Commonwealth Games in New Zealand, receiving a bronze medal on bars, which was the first medal achieved by a WAIS gymnast at a Commonwealth Games. In that same year, she won the Junior Sports Star of the Year Award in 1990 and 1991.

Telfer represented Australia at the 1992 Summer Olympics in Barcelona.

Medical career

After the 1992 Olympic Games, Telfer commenced medical studies at the University of Western Australia and became a paediatrician. She is now an associate professor in Adolescent Medicine at the Royal Children's Hospital in Melbourne.

In 2017, Telfer was instrumental in achieving legal reform for trans and gender diverse adolescents through the federal Family Court in the case known as Re Kelvin.

She is also lead author of the Australian Standards of Care and treatment guidelines for trans and gender diverse children and adolescents.

References

1974 births
Living people
Australian female artistic gymnasts
Gymnasts at the 1990 Commonwealth Games
Western Australian Institute of Sport alumni
Commonwealth Games medallists in gymnastics
Commonwealth Games silver medallists for Australia
Commonwealth Games bronze medallists for Australia
20th-century Australian women
Medallists at the 1990 Commonwealth Games